Queen Seonui of the Jeongju Ryu clan or formally called Grand Queen Mother Seonui, was a Goryeo princess, second daughter of King Taejo and Queen Jeongdeok. She married her half brother, Daejong of Goryeo, giving birth to three sons (among which King Seongjong), and two daughters, Queen Heonae and Queen Heonjeong.

Seonui and her husband died when their children were still young, so they were raised by their paternal grandmother. Both she and her husband were posthumously honoured as a king and queen after their second son, Wang Chi, ascended the throne.

Posthumous name
In April 1002 (5th year reign of King Mokjong), name Jeong-suk (정숙, 貞淑) was added. 
In March 1014 (5th year reign of King Hyeonjong), name Jeong-mok (정목, 靜穆) was added.
In April 1027 (18th year reign of King Hyeonjong), name Gwang-ui (광의, 匡懿) was added.
In October 1253 (40th year reign of King Gojong), name Ik-ja (익자, 益慈) was added to her posthumous name too.

References

External links
Queen Seonui on Encykorea .

Royal consorts of the Goryeo Dynasty
Goryeo princesses
10th-century Korean people
Year of birth unknown
Year of death unknown